The first season of Dynasty originally aired in the United States on ABC from January 12 through April 20, 1981. The series, created by Richard and Esther Shapiro and produced by Aaron Spelling, revolves around the Carringtons, a wealthy family residing in Denver, Colorado.

Season one stars John Forsythe as millionaire oil magnate Blake Carrington; Linda Evans as his new wife Krystle; Pamela Sue Martin as Blake's headstrong daughter Fallon; Al Corley as Blake's earnest son Steven; John James as playboy Jeff Colby; Wayne Northrop as Carrington chauffeur Michael Culhane; Bo Hopkins as Denver–Carrington geologist Matthew Blaisdel; Pamela Bellwood as Matthew's troubled wife Claudia; Katy Kurtzman as Matthew and Claudia's teenage daughter Lindsay Blaisdel; and Dale Robertson as wildcatter Walter Lankershim. Notable recurring performers include Lee Bergere as Carrington majordomo Joseph Anders, and Lloyd Bochner as Jeff's uncle, Cecil Colby.

Development
Aaron Spelling, already well known for his successful ABC series, including Starsky and Hutch, Charlie's Angels, The Love Boat, Fantasy Island, Vega$ and Hart to Hart, took on Richard and Esther Shapiro's vision of a rich and powerful family who "lived and sinned" in a 48-room Denver mansion. Esther Shapiro said that an inspiration for the show was I, Claudius, a fictionalized depiction of the Julio-Claudian dynasty of Roman emperors. Shapiro said in 1985, "We wanted to do something that would be fun, an American fantasy. We thought people had seen enough stories where families fell apart. We wanted a strong, nineteenth-century sort of family where people were in conflict but loved each other in spite of everything."

Intended by ABC to be a competitor for CBS's Dallas, the working title for Dynasty was Oil. In early drafts of the pilot script, the two main families featured in the series were known as the Parkhursts and Corbys; by the time production began, they had been renamed the Carringtons and Colbys. George Peppard was cast as series patriarch Blake Carrington, but ultimately had difficulties dealing with the somewhat unsympathetic role, and was quickly replaced with John Forsythe. Filmed in 1980, the pilot was among many delayed due to a strike precipitated by animosity between the television networks and the partnership of the Screen Actors Guild and the American Federation of Television and Radio Artists. Dynasty finally premiered on ABC as a three-hour event on January 12, 1981. The first season was ranked #28 in the United States.

Esther Shapiro later said in the DVD commentary of the first season, "The audience told us almost immediately: All they wanted to do was be in the mansion. [They] couldn't care less about the oil fields. They didn't want to see grubby rooms."

Plot
As Dynasty begins, powerful oil tycoon Blake Carrington is about to marry the younger Krystle Jennings, his former secretary. Beautiful, earnest, and new to Blake's world, Krystle finds a hostile reception in the Carrington household—the staff patronizes her, and Blake's headstrong and promiscuous daughter Fallon resents her. Though devoted to Krystle, Blake himself is too preoccupied with his company, Denver-Carrington, and blind to Krystle's predicament. Her only ally is her stepson Steven, whose complicated relationship with Blake stems from their fundamental political differences and Steven's resistance to step into his role as future leader of the Carrington empire. Meanwhile, Fallon, better suited to follow in Blake's footsteps, is (as a woman) underestimated by and considered little more than a trophy to her father. She channels her energies into toying with various male suitors, including the Carrington chauffeur Michael Culhane. At the end of the three-hour premiere episode "Oil", Steven finally confronts his father, criticizing Blake's capitalistic values and seemingly amoral business practices. Blake explodes, revealing the secret of which Steven thought his father was unaware: Blake is disgusted by Steven's homosexuality, and his refusal to "conform" sets father and son at odds for some time.

In counterpoint to the Carringtons are the Blaisdels; Denver-Carrington geologist Matthew—unhappily married to the emotionally fragile Claudia—is Krystle's ex-lover. Returning from an extended assignment in the Middle East, Matthew quits and goes into business with wildcatter Walter Lankershim. As Blake's behavior begins pushing Krystle toward Matthew, the men are set as both business and romantic rivals. Blake is further enraged when Steven goes to work for longtime friend Matthew, in whom Steven sees qualities lacking in Blake. Though previously in a relationship with another man, Steven finds himself drawn to Claudia, who is putting her life back together after spending time in a psychiatric hospital.

Fallon makes a secret business deal with Blake's old friend and more-powerful business rival Cecil Colby, marrying his nephew Jeff to secure Cecil's financial assistance for her father. When Blake stumbles upon Steven in an innocent goodbye embrace with his former lover Ted Dinard (Mark Withers), Blake angrily pushes the two men apart; Ted falls backward and hits his head, the injury proving fatal. Blake is arrested and charged with murder, and an angry Steven testifies that Ted's death had been the result of malicious intent. A veiled surprise witness for the prosecution appears in the season finale "The Testimony", and Fallon gasps in recognition: "Oh my God, that's my mother!"

Cast

Main 

 John Forsythe as Blake Carrington
 Linda Evans as Krystle Carrington
 Pamela Sue Martin as Fallon Carrington
 Pamela Bellwood as Claudia Blaisdel
 Al Corley as Steven Carrington
 John James as Jeff Colby
 Wayne Northrop as Michael Culhane
 Katy Kurtzman as Lindsay Blaisdel
 Dale Robertson as Walter Lankershim
 Bo Hopkins as Matthew Blaisdel

Recurring 

 Lee Bergere as Joseph Anders
 Peter Mark Richman as Andrew Laird
 Virginia Hawkins as Jeanette Robbins
 Lloyd Bochner as Cecil Colby
 Paul Jenkins as Ed Cleves
 Betty Harford as Hilda Gunnerson
 Mark Withers as Ted Dinard
 Brian Dennehy as Jake Dunham

Notable guest stars

 Lloyd Haynes as Judge Horatio Quinlan

Cast notes

Episodes

Reception
The first season of Dynasty was "modestly popular" among viewers, ranking #28 in the United States with a 19.0 Nielsen rating, while #1 series Dallas achieved a 31.8 rating that season. Season one of Dynasty aired on Monday nights. ABC rebroadcast the season in summer 1981 at 10:00 PM on Wednesdays, the new time slot for season two, and initiated a media blitz to promote the series.

References

External links
 

1981 American television seasons
Dynasty (1981 TV series) seasons